Susan Abrams (born 1964) is an American business executive who is the Chief Executive Officer of the Illinois Holocaust Museum and Education Center.

Early life and education
Abrams was born in New York City and attended the University of Pennsylvania, graduating in 1986 from the Wharton School summa cum laude. Abrams went on to get her Master of Management from Kellogg Graduate School of Management at Northwestern University.

Career
After graduation, Abrams became a financial analyst at Goldman Sachs and, later, a management consultant at McKinsey & Company. After McKinsey, Abrams took the position of Vice President of Business, Strategic Planning, Marketing and Communications at the Chicago Children’s Museum. She served in this role from 1991-1997.

In 1997, Abrams left the Chicago Children’s Museum. Three years later, she published The New Success Rules for Women: 10 Surefire Strategies for Reaching Your Career Goals. She subsequently founded a residential real estate company.

In 2009, Abrams became the Director of Program Review at Northwestern University.  After two years at the university, Abrams moved on to become COO of JCC Chicago. 
Since 2014, Abrams has been the CEO of the Illinois Holocaust Museum and Education Center. In June 2022, Abrams announced plans to step down as the director of the Holocaust Museum, stating that she would step down from her post "in the coming months."

Better Magazine named Abrams one of Chicago's Most Powerful Women in 2019.

References

1964 births
Living people
American women chief executives
Businesspeople from New York City
Wharton School of the University of Pennsylvania alumni
Kellogg School of Management alumni
Jews and Judaism in Chicago
American chief operating officers
21st-century American women